Synaphea drummondii is a shrub endemic to Western Australia.

The  shrub usually blooms between July and September producing yellow flowers.

It is found in the southern Wheatbelt and Goldfields-Esperance regions of Western Australia where it grows in sandy soils over laterite.

References

Eudicots of Western Australia
drummondii
Endemic flora of Western Australia
Plants described in 1857